Juho Hyvärinen (born 27 March 2000) is a Finnish footballer who plays on the wing as a defender and midfielder for FC Inter Turku.

References

2000 births
Living people
Finnish footballers
Finland youth international footballers
Finland under-21 international footballers
Association football midfielders
Rovaniemen Palloseura players
FC Inter Turku players
Veikkausliiga players